Helmut Adalbert Mahlke (27 August 1913 – 26 December 1998) was a highly decorated Oberstleutnant in the Luftwaffe during World War II, and a recipient of the Knight's Cross of the Iron Cross, the highest award in the military and paramilitary forces of Nazi Germany during World War II.

Awards and decorations
 Front Flying Clasp of the Luftwaffe in Gold 
 Iron Cross (1939) 
 2nd Class (16 April 1940)
 1st Class (21 June 1940)
 Wound Badge (1939) in Silver
 Eastern Front Medal (15 June 1942)
 Knight's Cross of the Iron Cross on 16 July 1941 as Hauptmann and Gruppenkommandeur of the III./Sturzkampfgeschwader 1
 German Cross in Gold on 31 March 1944 as Major im Generalstab (in the General Staff) in Luftflotte 6

Works
 Mahlke, Helmut (1993), Stuka Angriff: Sturzflug, Mittler Verlag, .

References

Citations

Bibliography

 
 
 
 

1913 births
1998 deaths
Military personnel from Berlin
Luftwaffe pilots
German World War II pilots
Bundeswehr generals
People from the Province of Brandenburg
Recipients of the Gold German Cross
Recipients of the Knight's Cross of the Iron Cross
German prisoners of war in World War II
Lieutenant generals of the German Air Force
People from Steglitz-Zehlendorf